Dark Medicine (originally known as The Eugenist) is a 2013 American horror film produced, written and directed by Tariq Nasheed.

Plot
A group of college students break into an abandoned school to explore it.  Once inside, they find that the school is not completely abandoned thanks to a eugenics program gone horribly wrong.

Reception
Horrornews.net, giving the movie 2 tombstones out of 5, said, " Fans of teen horror flicks with a twist may want to give it a try. A climatic end that will surprise most is worth a look in its own right." On the other hand, Nav Qateel writing in Influx magazine gave the movie a D+, writing, "There wasn’t a single thing in this uncostly, unscary, rather short movie which spoke of hidden talent."

References

External links

American zombie films
2013 horror films
2013 films
2013 horror thriller films
Films set in schools
African-American horror films
Eugenics in fiction
2010s English-language films
2010s American films